Taftanaz Air Base is an airbase located  south of Taftanaz, Idlib Governorate and  east of Ta'um, Idlib Governorate, Syria.

Taftanaz was home to two squadrons of Mil-8/17 Hip helicopters until its capture by the Syrian Opposition.

Led by jihadist fighters from the Al-Nusra Front and an Ahrar ash-Sham battalion, Syrian rebels overran Taftanaz during the second week of January 2013.

On 6 February 2020, the Turkish Armed Forces constructed a military installation on the premises of the airbase, as Syrian Government forces advanced toward it during the 2020 Northwestern Syria offensive. It was targeted with airstrikes by the Syrian Air Force just hours after being constructed.

On 2 March 2020, the Syrian Observatory for Human Rights reported a Syrian Government attack on Taftanaz Airport leaving one Turkish soldier dead and three wounded.

See also
 List of Syrian Air Force bases

References

External links
 Rebel fighters, mostly Islamists, seize key Syrian air base - The Washington Post

Syrian Air Force bases